All About My Father is a 2002 Norwegian biographical documentary film written and directed by Even Benestad. All About My Father is a personal documentary about the director's father, the famous sexologist and trans person Esben Esther Pirelli Benestad, who lives in the southern Norwegian city of Grimstad.

The film won the Teddy Award for best documentary at the 2002 Berlin International Film Festival, the Critics' Award at the 2002 Gothenburg Film Festival, and the Documentary Award at The Norwegian Short Film Festival in Grimstad. It also won the 2002 Amanda Award for Best Film (Norwegian). The film was well received by critics, getting five out of six points from reviewers in Aftenposten, Dagbladet, Verdens Gang and the NRK radio show Filmpolitiet.

Internationally, the film was shown in several film festivals.

References 

2002 films
2002 documentary films
Norwegian documentary films
Biographical documentary films
Transgender-related documentary films
Films scored by John Erik Kaada
Norwegian biographical films
Norwegian LGBT-related films
2002 LGBT-related films
Cultural depictions of transgender people
Cultural depictions of biologists